The Roman Catholic Diocese of Požega is an ecclesiastical territory or diocese of the Roman Catholic Church in the Slavonia region of Croatia. The diocese is centred in the city of Požega. It was first erected in 1997 after being split from the Archdiocese of Zagreb. The archdiocese had grown too large to effectively serve its faithful.

Požega was selected as the seat of diocese because of its historic tradition, as an urban centre since the 13th century. It was also the site of the first institution of higher education in Slavonia - the Jesuit Academy established in 1761.

The diocese covers the territory of western Slavonia as well as parts of Podravina (Virovitica) and Posavina (Nova Gradiška). This region suffered greatly during the Croatian War of Independence, and the need for the church to help in the recovery was another reason for the diocese's creation. Many church holdings were destroyed during the course of the war, and the recovery is still an ongoing process.

The diocese has 270,000 faithful, who are organized into the deaneries of Našice, Nova Gradiška, Nova Kapela, Pakrac, Požega and Virovitica with a total of 85 parishes.

Currently, Bishop Antun Škvorčević is head of the diocese. The diocesan cathedral is Saint Teresa of Ávila Cathedral.

On June 18, 2008, the diocese was shifted from suffragan to the Archdiocese of Zagreb, to a suffragan of the Archdiocese of Djakovo-Osijek

Ordinaries
Antun Škvorčević (5 Jul 1997 Appointed - )

External links
Official website  
Diocese of Požega at Catholic-Hierarchy.org

Christian organizations established in 1997
Dioceses established in the 20th century
Pozega
Požega, Croatia